The 1988 Prize of Moscow News was the 23rd edition of an international figure skating competition organized in Leningrad, Soviet Union. It was held November 2–6, 1988. Medals were awarded in the disciplines of men's singles, ladies' singles, pair skating and ice dancing. Soviet skaters swept the men's podium, led by Vladimir Petrenko. American Tonya Harding won the ladies' title ahead of Natalia Lebedeva from the Soviet Union. Soviets Natalia Mishkutenok / Artur Dmitriev, who would medal at the European Championships later in the season, took the pairs' title ahead of their compatriots, Elena Bechke / Denis Petrov, who would end their season with the world bronze medal. Olympic silver medalists Marina Klimova / Sergei Ponomarenko won the ice dancing title for the third consecutive year.

Men

Ladies

Pairs

Ice dancing

References

1988 in figure skating
Prize of Moscow News